Henry James Tufton, 1st Baron Hothfield (4 June 1844 – 29 October 1926), known as Sir Henry James Tufton, 2nd Baronet, from 1871 to 1881, was a British peer, Liberal politician and owner and breeder of racehorses.

Hothfield was the son of Sir Richard Tufton, 1st Baronet, and his wife Adelaide Amelie Lacour. His father was the reputed natural son of Henry Tufton, 11th and last Earl of Thanet, and had succeeded to the Tufton estates on the death of the Earl in 1849. Hothfield succeeded his father as second Baronet in 1871 and in 1881 he was raised to the peerage as Baron Hothfield, of Hothfield in the County of Kent. The same year he was appointed Lord Lieutenant of Westmorland, a post he held until 1926. He stood for election for the  Liberal party in the 1880 general election in Westmorland. In 1886, he also served briefly as a Lord-in-waiting (government whip in the House of Lords) in the Liberal administration of William Ewart Gladstone. He was also a prominent breeder and owner of racehorses.

Lord Hothfield married Alice Harriet, daughter of Reverend William James Stracy-Clitherow, in 1872. He died in October 1926, aged 82, and was succeeded in his titles by his eldest son John. Lady Hothfield died in 1914.

See also
Earl of Thanet

References

Kidd, Charles, Williamson, David (editors). Debrett's Peerage and Baronetage (1990 edition). New York: St Martin's Press, 1990, 

1844 births
1926 deaths
Barons in the Peerage of the United Kingdom
Liberal Party (UK) Lords-in-Waiting
Lord-Lieutenants of Westmorland
Peers of the United Kingdom created by Queen Victoria